The Money-Maker Recipe (Traditional Chinese: 師奶股神) is a TVB modern drama series broadcast in May 2008.

Synopsis 
"HOUSEWIVES" always are the good long term bets compared to the other options.

Wong Chi-Chung (Michael Tse) is a stockbroker who is too timid to take risks and not wise enough. This caused many of his customers to switch to a new security firm which has newly opened in the same housing estate. The new firm is managed by a top broker, Ting Shiu-King (Dominic Lam), who is tricky and manipulative. He is assisted by his partner, Koo Ka-Chun (Joyce Tang). He then comes up with a plan to expand his customer base by developing the housewives market. He exploits Chung's wife Tseung Yu-Chu (Kiki Sheung) to carry out his plan by feeding her with information about the stock market. Chu trusts him and therefore follows his advice blindly. She earns a lot of money through King's information and influences all the other housewives to follow her lead.

Chung is unhappy that his wife is being exploited and discourages Chu to indulge in stock market. Chu refuses to listen and Chung becomes resentful. The market suddenly drops drastically causing the housewives to lose large amounts of money. Chu turns over a new leaf by working multiple jobs to repay her debt and hoping to reconcile with Chung. Unfortunately, Chun and King has set a trap to frame Chung. Chu, being an extraordinary housewife decides to bounce back and gets ready to strive against the villainy in order to save her husband.  The plot mainly becomes a story about small community versus big corporation.

Cast

Viewership ratings

Awards and nominations 
41st TVB Anniversary Awards (2008)
 "Best Drama"
 "My Favourite Male Character" (Michael Tse – Wong Chi-Chung)
 "My Favourite Female Character" (Kiki Sheung – Tseung Yu-Chu)

References

External links 
 

2008 Hong Kong television series debuts
2008 Hong Kong television series endings
TVB dramas